Stanley Vincent Wilson (23 September 1948 – 23 March 2022) was an Australian cricketer. He played six first-class matches for Western Australia and South Australia between 1968–69 and 1975–76.

A right-arm pace bowler, Wilson was a stalwart for Midland-Guildford in the Perth competition but was unable to establish a place in the Western Australia team at a time when Western Australia had a wealth of pace bowlers. His best first-class figures were 4 for 29 for Western Australia against South Australia in December 1968.

See also
 List of Western Australia first-class cricketers

References

External links
 

1948 births
2022 deaths
Cricketers from Perth, Western Australia
Australian cricketers
South Australia cricketers
Western Australia cricketers